Andrew William Hastie is an Australian politician, and former military officer, serving as the Shadow Minister for Defence since 2022. He previously served as the Assistant Minister for Defence from 2020 to 2022 under in the Morrison Government. Hastie was Chair of the Parliamentary Joint Committee on Intelligence and Security from 2017 to 2019, which he rejoined in 2022. Prior to politics, he was a troop commander in the Special Air Service Regiment.

Early life
Hastie was born in Wangaratta to Sue, a primary school teacher for children with special needs, and Peter, who had started a church in that country town. At age 5, he and his family moved to Sydney when his father became the pastor of the Presbyterian Church in Ashfield. He began his Primary education at Ashbury Public School. From year 5 he attended The Scots College in Sydney, completing his Higher School Certificate in 2000.

Intending to become a journalist, Hastie began a Bachelor of Arts in History, Politics and Philosophy at the Kensington Campus of University of New South Wales in 2001.

The 9/11 terrorist attacks, which killed the daughter of his primary school teacher, prompted Hastie to change plans. After completing second year at the Kensington Campus, he transferred to the Australian Defence Force Academy in Canberra in 2003, finishing his bachelor's degree in 2004. He took an honours year in 2005; where his final thesis examined Charles Bean's official history of the Australian and New Zealand Army Corps.

Hastie went on to officer training at Royal Military College, Duntroon in 2006, where he met his political mentor John Anderson. In 2007, Hastie completed the George Washington University Elliott School of International Affairs U.S. Foreign Policy Summer Program in Washington, D.C.

Military career

Hastie began military service as a reservist in 2001 with the University of New South Wales Regiment. After graduation from Duntroon in 2006, he was commissioned as a lieutenant in December of that year.

His first posting was to the 2nd Cavalry Regiment of the Royal Australian Armoured Corps, based in Palmerston, Northern Territory in 2007. Hastie took command of troop of Australian Light Armoured Vehicles in 2008. He led the troop on operations in Afghanistan as part of Mentoring Task Force Two, at the start of the fighting season in May 2009, concluding in February 2010.

On returning to Australia, Hastie moved to Perth to prepare for the "brutal" SASR Selection course, which ran between July and August 2010. Of the 130 soldiers who began, Hastie was one of 30 who completed the course, and he was put forward for the regiment's 16-month Reinforcement Cycle. From there, Hastie was assigned to 1 SASR Squadron, which was deployed in May 2012 to Port Moresby to support the Papua New Guinea Defence Force during a general election.

Now an officer in special forces, Hastie returned to Afghanistan a second and third time. He deployed for a brief period in October 2012 where he witnessed Australian operations in Syachow in Uruzgan Province. Then, from February to July 2013, he deployed to Afghanistan as a troop commander with Special Operations Task Group Rotation XIX, largely targeting Taliban forces in partnership with other Afghan forces.

During a battle in Zabul, a member of Hastie's SASR troop severed the hands of deceased Taliban soldiers, ostensibly for the purposes of conducting biometric testing. Seeing this, Hastie ordered his unit to cease the practice, and the incident was reported to ADF command. An inquiry later found troops were trained in biometrics to identify combatants, which included the collection of body parts, though there was no explicit instruction to do so. At the conclusion of the inquiry, both soldier and troop commander were cleared of wrongdoing.

Hastie was deployed in 2014 and 2015 to an intelligence role in the Middle East-based role countering ISIL as an Operations Officer for Operation Gallant Phoenix. Hastie resigned from the ADF in August 2015, announcing his candidacy for the 2015 Canning by-election.

Political career (2015–present)
Hastie was first elected to Parliament in the 2015 Canning by-election, and was re-elected in the 2016, 2019 and 2022 federal elections.

Turnbull government
The seat of Canning became vacant following the death of Don Randall, which triggered the 2015 Canning by-election. Having won the Liberal Party pre-selection Hastie launched his campaign in the electorate with support from Mathias Cormann and Julie Bishop, but was met with media criticism about the "severed hands" incident and his family's religious beliefs.

On election day, Hastie won 55.26% of votes under the two-party-preferred system, defeating Labor candidate Matt Keogh and making him the 10th Federal Member for Canning. He joined the government benches of Malcolm Turnbull who had himself become Prime Minister of Australia a week before the by-election. Hastie gave his first speech on 13 October 2015, arguing for a more realistic view of the military's ability to change other nations, and for the need to restore trust in public institutions, especially Parliament.
Hastie stood again for the division of Canning for the 2016 Australian federal election, winning 56.79% of the votes under the Two-party-preferred vote against Labor opposition candidate Barry Winmar, moving his seat from being "marginal" to "fairly safe" according to the Australian Electoral Commission.   In September 2016 Hastie was appointed to the Parliamentary Joint Committee on Intelligence and Security, serving as Chair from February 2017 to April 2019.

Morrison government
During the August 2018 Liberal Party leadership spills, Hastie publicly supported a change in the party leadership. While he backed Peter Dutton's candidacy, Scott Morrison was won the leadership spill, becoming Prime Minister of Australia.

In his electorate, Hastie supported striking Alcoa Australia workers, organised by the Australian Workers' Union, saying that carbon regulations create pressures on the energy sector that are "hurting industry, workers, seniors and families." Further, he opposed dredging and the Mandurah Estuary for a 300-berth marina, citing the lack of grassroots interest as well as environmental and possible geo-strategic concerns. However, he strongly supported the $22 million foreshore development project, allocating $7 million in federal funds, towards a new civic square, convention centre, a large-scale adventure play area and an ecotourism hub.

In the 2019 Australian federal election, held on 18 May, Hastie ran for re-election and won 61.55% of the two-party-preferred vote against the Australian Labor Party's candidate Mellisa Teede.

Assistant Minister for Defence 
Through 2019, Hastie spoke in 45 debates in the Parliament, above average according to Open Australia, mostly regarding national security matters. On 22 December 2020, Morrison named Hastie as the Assistant Defence Minister. In this role he became an advocate for AUKUS and the Quadrilateral Security Dialogue, strongly criticising the views of Paul Keating for being "counter to our national interests."

Hastie supported welfare of service personnel, opening new defence healthcare facilities in Canberra and Perth. He raised awareness on cyber attacks on Australia, the work of the Australian Signals Directorate, and the importance of combat simulation systems. During this time he put Cape-class patrol boats into service for the Royal Australian Navy and Guardian-class patrol boats for partner forces in Micronesia.

While holding his defence portfolio, Hastie was called as a witness for three Australian newspapers who stood accused of defaming Ben Roberts-Smith as "a war criminal." In the years when Roberts-Smith had served in Afghanistan with 3 Squadron and 2 Squadron of the SAS Regiment, Hastie had served with the 2nd Cavalry Regiment and, later, with 1 Squadron. The soldiers had briefly crossed paths in 2010 when Hastie was on SASR selection and Roberts-Smith was a trainer; then in 2012 in Syahchow, Uruzgan Province.

It was here, according to The Age, The Canberra Times and The Sydney Morning Herald, an alleged "blooding" incident had occurred, involving Roberts-Smith. In this alleged practice, a new soldier is said to be initiated by a more experienced soldier, by registering a kill in a battle, and this may be of an unarmed prisoner. Under oath, Hastie stated that he believed an Australian soldier, known as person 66, who was under the command of Roberts-Smith, had been blooded. Under cross-examination, Hastie was accused of being motivated by "hate" for Roberts-Smith. Hastie's responded: "I pity him... this is terrible for our country. It's terrible for the SAS. It's terrible for the army. But until we deal with it, we can't move forward."

As of January 2023, the court was yet to return a verdict.

Shadow Ministry 
The 2022 Australian federal election, Hastie saw a large swing of 10.6% against the Coalition in Western Australia, though he was able to retain his seat with 54.8 per cent in the two-party preferred contest.

In Opposition for the first time, Hastie was chosen by Liberal Party leader Peter Dutton to serve as Shadow Minister for Defence. He was also nominated to re-join the Parliamentary Joint Committee for Intelligence and Security.

Early in the role, Hastie travelled to both the UK and the USA to urge governments and defence industry to speed up the delivery of Nuclear-powered submarines under the 2021 AUKUS security pact. Further, Hastie advocated for the Albanese government to ramp up the military's lethal force by "all necessary means" so as to ensure peace and security in the Indo-Pacific region.

He appeared to maintain a hawkish position towards China through active involvement with IPAC along with Liberal Senator James Paterson and Labor Senator Deborah O'Neill. He supported the actions of the Albanese government to ensure retired Royal Australian Air Force pilots are prevented from sharing tactics, techniques and procedures with China. According to official documents, Hastie participated in Singapore's Lee Kuan Yew Exchange Fellowship, meeting with senior Cabinet members in January 2023.

Political views

Hastie's political views have been described as both "conservative" and "complex." He is opposed to discrimination based on ethnicity, religion, sex and sexuality, and was a strong supporter of an Australian Magnitsky Act, enabling sanctions against global figures who commit human rights abuses. At the same time, he has campaigned for a traditional understanding of marriage, and in the Australian marriage debate he ultimately abstained from the parliamentary vote. As such, some commentators have placed him in the National Right grouping of the Liberal Party. He is a member of the Atlantic Council, an international foreign policy think tank connected to conservative politicians Mike Gallagher from the United States and Tom Tugendhat from the United Kingdom. Hastie has cited his Christian religion as informing his views on various policies, such as individual freedoms.

Free institutions and free press 
Hastie believes that "freely formed associations are the basis of Australian society and are the fullest expression of self-government." Hastie has expressed concern about the freedom of Australian universities and media institutions.

In May 2018, Hastie used parliamentary privilege to claim Chinese Australian businessman Chau Chak Wing was an unindicted co-conspirator in an FBI bribery case involving former president of the UN general assembly, John Ashe, which Hastie saw as "his duty." An ABC reporter noted that Chau Chak Wing was, at that time, in ultimately successful court proceedings against Nine media for defamation and quoted Hastie as saying he acted "because he has become sincerely worried about the influence of China on Australian institutions and politics."

Communist China 
Concern for Australian sovereignty prompted a column from Hastie that was later to cause a "firestorm" in Sino-Australian relations. In August 2019, he wrote an opinion article, "We Must See China with Clear Eyes" for The Sydney Morning Herald and The Age newspapers, where he stated that Communist China, rather than Islamic terrorism, would be the real security concern of the 21st century. The piece was criticised by the Chinese Embassy in Australia, who denounced the remarks as reflecting a "Cold War mentality", while Western Australian Premier Mark McGowan accused Hastie of "threatening WA jobs with extreme and inflammatory language." Conversely, Hastie received praise from fellow Liberal MPs Dave Sharma and Peter Dutton, and Professor Clive Hamilton. The embassy disinvited him on a planned study trip with several colleagues to China with the China Matters think tank, stating “that at this time Mr Hastie and Senator Paterson are not welcome" unless they "genuinely repent and redress their mistakes."

In May 2020, Hastie was one of 20 Australian politicians to sign a letter condemning the "comprehensive assault on [Hong Kong's] autonomy, rule of law and fundamental freedoms", in response to a "new legal framework and enforcement mechanism".

Hastie was one of a number of backbenchers who pushed for added restrictions on foreign investment of Australian companies. He was a strong supporter of the Turnbull Government's decision to prevent Huawei from providing 5G services in Australia. He argued that such purchases are part of wider political warfare conducted by the Chinese Communist Party. His concerns regarding Australia maintaining its sovereignty in the face of China's rising power in the region led him to form the Parliamentary Friends of Democracy with Labor senator Kimberley Kitching. On 4 June 2020, the 31st anniversary of the Tiananmen Square Massacre, Hastie joined a group of nineteen other politicians from eight countries and the European Parliament to form the Inter-Parliamentary Alliance on China, including Kitching.

Community and environment 
Arguing in favour of "the sovereignty of local communities to make decisions about how they conserve and develop their environment", Hastie opposed the dredging of The Point Grey Marina but supported the investment of $3 million by the Environment Restoration Fund to protect Carnaby's black cockatoo, a native bird endemic to Southwest Australia and currently listed as endangered due to loss of habitat. Hastie has publicly opposed the Paris Agreement on reducing greenhouse gas emissions, and the National Energy Guarantee, especially as it would negatively affect workers in the aluminium industry. He made it clear in August 2018 that he did not support the NEG as it existed at the time. He cited issues including unclear assurances of energy affordability and energy related risks to national security as his reasons for opposing the policies.

Personal life

Hastie met his wife Ruth in the summer of 2007 while he was studying at George Washington University. Their first date was "watching then-president George W. Bush walk from the Oval Office across the lawns of the White House to be whisked away in the Marine One helicopter." Some months later, Hastie proposed to Ruth on the steps of the Sydney Opera House. The two were married in 2008 at Capitol Hill Baptist Church. Their children were born in Perth in June 2015, August 2017 and November 2021. The family of five now lives in the City of Mandurah in the Peel region of Western Australia.

A self-described student of history, Hastie has strongly encourages historical understanding to solve contemporary issues. He lists "biographies, Shakespeare, psalms" among his interests. In 2016, he launched the Canning Shakespeare Festival, encouraging high school students to know and perform the playwright's works.

Hastie has been recognised as "a man of deep faith". After rejecting religion in adolescence, he has been part of reformed and evangelical churches including Capitol Hill Baptist Church in Washington DC, Shenton Park Anglican Church, Crossroads Church in Canberra (a congregation of the Fellowship of Independent Evangelical Churches), and Peel Presbyterian Church in Mandurah.

Honours and awards

References

Sources

 

 

Australian Army officers
Australian military personnel of the War in Afghanistan (2001–2021)
Australian Anglicans
Liberal Party of Australia members of the Parliament of Australia
Australian monarchists
Elliott School of International Affairs alumni
Living people
Members of the Australian House of Representatives
Members of the Australian House of Representatives for Canning
People educated at Scots College (Sydney)
People from Wangaratta
Royal Military College, Duntroon graduates
University of New South Wales alumni
21st-century Australian politicians
Year of birth missing (living people)